Freddie Steps Out is a 1946 American film starring Freddie Stewart.

It is the second in The Teen Agers series.

Plot
Freddie Trimball is a high school student. He happens to bear an amazing resemblance to Frankie Troy, one of the most popular young singers in the country.

Tired of working and tired of being pursued by bobby-soxers and other fans, Frankie tells his managers he needs a break. They try to discourage him while Freddie's classmates come up with a hoax, claiming that "Frankie" has gone back to school. Mix-up after mix-up follows, with Freddie's girlfriend, Dodie Rogers, every bit as confused as Frankie's wife, who has a baby. It all comes to a head when Frankie ends up singing in a school show.

Cast
 Freddie Stewart as Freddie / Frankie
 June Preisser as Dodie
 Jackie Moran as Jimmy
 Noel Neill as Betty
 Frankie Darro as Roy

References

External links

1946 films
1946 musical comedy films
1940s teen films
American black-and-white films
American musical comedy films
Films directed by Arthur Dreifuss
Monogram Pictures films
1940s English-language films
1940s American films